Latham, Alabama is an unincorporated community in Baldwin County, Alabama, United States.

It is the location of Latham United Methodist Church, which is listed on the U.S. National Register of Historic Places.

History
Latham was most likely named after the first postmaster, Latham Cooper. A post office operated under the name Latham from 1880 to 1960.

References

Unincorporated communities in Baldwin County, Alabama
Unincorporated communities in Alabama